Peter Nogly (born 14 January 1947) is a former German football player and coach.

Club career 
All his 320 West German top-flight matches he made in the Hamburger SV shirt. He played in the North American Soccer League for the Edmonton Drillers and Tampa Bay Rowdies. He was a first team all-star selection in 1981 and 1982, and earned a place on the NASL's 2nd team in 1980. Nogly scored a goal in the finals of the 1983 indoor finals which Tampa Bay won 5–4.

International career 
Nogly earned four caps for the West Germany national team in 1977. He was included in the West German team for the UEFA Euro 1976, but did not play.

Honours
Hamburger SV
 Bundesliga: 1978–79
 DFB-Pokal: 1975–76; runner-up: 1973–74
 European Cup Winners' Cup: 1976–77
 European Cup runner-up: 1979–80

Tampa Bay Rowdies
 NASL indoor: 1983

West Germany
 European Championship runner-up: 1976

Individual
 NASL All-star first team: 1981, 1982
 NASL All-star second team: 1980

References

External links
 
 
 
 
 NASL career stats

Living people
1947 births
West German footballers
Association football midfielders
Edmonton Drillers (1979–1982) players
FC St. Pauli players
Bundesliga players
2. Bundesliga players
German footballers
Germany international footballers
Germany under-21 international footballers
1. FC Phönix Lübeck players
Hamburger SV players
Hertha BSC players
North American Soccer League (1968–1984) players
North American Soccer League (1968–1984) indoor players
Tampa Bay Rowdies (1975–1993) players
UEFA Euro 1976 players
VfB Lübeck players
German football managers
VfB Lübeck managers
SC Victoria Hamburg managers
Al-Shaab CSC managers
West German expatriate footballers
West German expatriate sportspeople in Canada
Expatriate soccer players in Canada
West German expatriate sportspeople in the United States
Expatriate soccer players in the United States
German expatriate sportspeople in the United Arab Emirates
Expatriate football managers in the United Arab Emirates
German expatriate football managers
West German football managers
Sportspeople from Lübeck
Footballers from Schleswig-Holstein